Laurel Hollow is a village in the Town of Oyster Bay in Nassau County, on the North Shore of Long Island, in New York, United States. The population was 1,952 at the 2010 census. According to Bloomberg BusinessWeek, Laurel Hollow was the eighth wealthiest town in America.

History 
The settlement began circa 1653 with purchase of land from the local natives. The village was incorporated in 1926 as "Lauralton," but the name was changed to "Laurel Hollow" in 1935 to avoid postal confusion with Laurelton in Queens. Today, Laurel Hollow is served by post offices in the hamlets of Syosset, Oyster Bay, Woodbury and Cold Spring Harbor.

The globally renowned Cold Spring Harbor Laboratory is located in the village.

Geography

The village is situated in Nassau County and creates a portion of Nassau's eastern border with Suffolk County. Hilly terrain predominates in the area, and the forests are mostly deciduous trees with a low canopy of laurel bushes that provide a low evergreen canopy. Route 25A passes through Laurel Hollow east-west.

Demographics

As of the census of 2000, there were 1,930 people, 598 households, and 528 families residing in the village. The population density was 660.0 people per square mile (255.2/km2). There were 621 housing units at an average density of 212.4 per square mile (82.1/km2). The racial makeup of the village was 91.30% White, 0.88% African American, 6.84% Asian, 0.21% from other races, and 0.78% from two or more races. Hispanic or Latino of any race were 1.97% of the population.

There were 598 households, out of which 44.8% had children under the age of 18 living with them, 81.8% were married couples living together, 5.4% had a female householder with no husband present, and 11.7% were non-families. 10.4% of all households were made up of individuals, and 4.5% had someone living alone who was 65 years of age or older. The average household size was 3.20 and the average family size was 3.37.

In the village, the population was spread out, with 30.4% under the age of 18, 4.4% from 18 to 24, 21.7% from 25 to 44, 30.0% from 45 to 64, and 13.5% who were 65 years of age or older. The median age was 41 years. For every 100 females, there were 88.8 males. For every 100 females age 18 and over, there were 87.0 males.

The median income for a household in the village was in excess of $200,000, as is the median income for a family. Males had a median income of over $100,000 versus $60,000 for females. The per capita income for the village was $83,366. About 0.7% of families and 1.9% of the population were below the poverty line, including 1.0% of those under age 18 and 7.3% of those age 65 or over.

Education 
Laurel Hollow is primarily served by the Cold Spring Harbor Central School District in Cold Spring Harbor (which is predominantly in Suffolk County), although a small portion of the village is served by the Oyster Bay-East Norwich Central School District.

Landmarks 
Cold Spring Harbor Laboratory, a non-profit institute that conducts biomedical research, trains scientists, and organizes scientific conferences. 
Cold Spring Harbor Fish Hatchery and Aquarium.
Laurel Hollow Beach, on the west coast of Cold Spring Harbor's inner harbor.

Notable people
Jay Gould,  leading American railroad developer and speculator. His success at business made him the ninth richest U.S. citizen in history. Built Cedar Knolls for his grandson Frank Gould.
John Lennon, member of The Beatles, owned a home with wife Yoko Ono in Laurel Hollow at the time of his death.
Lindsay Lohan, actress and TV personality, spent her early childhood years in Laurel Hollow.
Doug Morris, Chairman and CEO of Sony Music Entertainment. He previously served as Chairman and CEO of the Universal Music Group from 1995 to 2011.  Founder (and former Chairman) of VEVO.
Louis Comfort Tiffany, the artist and decorative designer whose glass vases, lamps and windows depict scenes inspired by the view from Laurelton Hall, his estate in Laurel Hollow, and three of whose stained glass windows are housed in St. John's Episcopal Church in Cold Spring Harbor.
James D. Watson, co-discoverer of the double-helix structure of DNA and former chancellor of Cold Spring Harbor Laboratory.
Ned Lamont, Governor of Connecticut (2019-present), spent some of his childhood years in Laurel Hollow.

References

External links
 Official website

Oyster Bay (town), New York
Villages in New York (state)
Villages in Nassau County, New York
Populated coastal places in New York (state)